The following is a list of original programming currently, formerly, and soon to be broadcast by TelevisaUnivision owned television networks. TelevisaUnivision owns six broadcast television networks: Las Estrellas, Canal 5, FOROtv and Nu9ve in Mexico, and Univision and UniMás in the United States.

Current programming

Las Estrellas
Dramas
 La rosa de Guadalupe (February 5, 2008)
 Como dice el dicho (February 1, 2011)
 Esta historia me suena (May 13, 2019)
 Mi camino es amarte (November 7, 2022)
 Marimar (January 24, 2023)
 Perdona nuestros pecados (January 30, 2023)
 El amor invencible (February 20, 2023)
 Eternamente amándonos (February 27, 2023)

Comedies
 La familia P. Luche (August 7, 2002)
 La parodia (October 28, 2002)
 Vecinos (July 10, 2005)
 Nosotros los guapos (November 8, 2016)
 40 y 20 (November 9, 2016)
 Renta congelada (August 31, 2017)
 Lorenza (March 22, 2019)
 Mi querida herencia (August 29, 2019)
 Relatos macabrones (August 31, 2020)
 Me caigo de risa: Gala disfuncional (March 28, 2021)
 Tic Tac Toc: El reencuentro (April 12, 2021)
 Perdiendo el juicio (September 27, 2021)
 ¿Tú crees? (July 31, 2022)

Reality/non-scripted
 Pequeños Gigantes (March 27, 2011)
 ¿Quién es la máscara? (August 25, 2019)
 El retador (August 15, 2021)

Game shows
 100 mexicanos dijieron (2001)
 Minuto para ganar VIP (2013)

Talk/Late-night shows
 Cuéntamelo ya (April 16, 2016)
 + NOCHE (August 25, 2018)

News and information
 Hoy (August 3, 1998)
 Las Noticias (August 22, 2016)
 Despierta (August 22, 2016)
 Al aire con Paola Rojas (August 22, 2016)
 En punto con Denise Maerker (August 22, 2016)

Sports
 Liga MX
 Acción (1979)
 La jugada (1993)
 Más deporte (1997)

Canal 5
 Me caigo de risa (March 4, 2014)
 Reto 4 elementos (March 19, 2018)
 Inseparables: amor al límite (May 27, 2019)

Nu9ve
Talk/reality shows
 Reventón musical
 ¡Despierta América! (July 9, 2018)
 Enámorandonos (September 13, 2021)

News/public affairs programming
 Aquí y Ahora
 Domingo de tercer milenio

Sports
 Hazaña el deporte vive
 Lucha Libre AAA

FOROtv
 Agenda Pública
 A las tres
 Creadores Universitarios
 En 1 hora
 Es la hora de opinar
 Estrictamente Personal
 Foro Global
 Fractal
 Historias por Contar
 Las Noticias
 Major League Baseball
 Matutino Express
 Noticias CDMX
 Paralelo 23
 Si me dicen no vengo
 Sin Filtro

Upcoming programming

Former programming

Telenovelas

Comedies 
 Alma de ángel (2019)
 Ay María qué puntería (1998)
 Cepillin (1977)
 El Chavo del Ocho (1970)
 Chespirito (1970; 1980–1995)
 El Diablito
 Foro Loco
 El Grosero (Bad Language Show)
 La Hora Azul (1992)
 Incógnito (2005)
 Julia vs. Julia (2019)
 Mi Barrio (1991–1994)
 Mi lista de exes (2018)
 La Matraca
 Odisea Burbujas
 La Officina
 Operacion Ja Ja
 Los Polivoces
 ¡Qué madre tan padre! (2006)
 Según Bibi (2018)
 Simón dice (2018–2019)
 S.O.S.S.A
 Todo de Todo (1991–1994)
 Un Criada Bien Criada
 Y sin embargo se mueve (1994)
 Con permiso (1996)
 Dr. Cándido Pérez (1987–1993)

Game shows 
 Siempre en domingo (1969-1998)
 XE-TU (1982-1987) & XE-TÚ Remix (1996)
 Atinale al Precio (The Price Is Right) (1997–2000), (2010)
 Nuevas Tardes (1996)
 ¡Llévatelo! (Take It!) (1993-1995)
 La Rueda de la Fortuna (1994 - 1996)
 ¡Pácatelas! (1995 - 1997)
 Picardía Mexicana (1997 - 2000)
 Mucho Gusto (1999) Con Laura Zapata
 En Familia con Chabelo (1967-2015)
 Fantastico Amor (1999)
 Vida TV Moved to Vida TV, El Show
 Club 4TV & El Club (2001 - 2003)
 Nuestra Casa (2002 - 2007) 4TV & Canal 2
 La Botana (1997 - 2000)
 Se vale (2006 - 2012)
 Arriesga TV (2009)
 Al Mediodía AMD (2005 - 2006)

Talk/news programming 
 1N Primero Noticias (1999 - 2002), (2004 - 2016)
 24 Horas (1970-1998)
 En Contacto Directo 
 60 minutos
 Adal, el Show (2015)
 Al Despertar (1992-1998)
 Al Aire (1992-1993), (2016)
 Aquí entre 2 (2000) finals
 A Través del Video (1995 - 1998)
 Chapultepec 18 (1998), (2016).
 Duro Y Directo (1997 - 1999)
 Economía de Mercado
 El Mañanero
 El Noticiero con Guillermo Ortega (1998-2000)
 El Noticiero con Joaquín López Dóriga (2000-2016)
 El Noticiero con Lolita Ayala (1998-2016)
 En Concreto (1997)
 En Contraste (2002 - 2004)
 En 1 Hora
 Fuera de la Ley
 Hora 21
 Hoy Mismo
 Las Noticias por Adela
 Muchas Noticias (1987–1998)
 Noticias ECO (1988–2001)
 Nuestro Mundo (1986–1988)
 Otro Rollo (1995–2007)
 Respuesta Opportuna
 Todo se vale (1999)
 Versus

Reality/non-scripted 
 DL & Compañía (2020)
 Doble sentido (June 4, 2016 – August 18, 2018)
 Está cañón
 El coque va
 Familias frente al fuego (July 14, 2019 – August 18, 2019)
 Furia Musical (1993)
 Miembros al aire
 Mira quién baila (2018)
 La tradición Sábados de Box
 TV de Noche
 Siempre en domingo (1969-1998)

Sports 
 ¿A quién le vas? (2016–2018)

See also
 Televisa
 TelevisaUnivision

Notes

References

 

Televisa
Televisa